Stygnocorini is a tribe of dirt-colored seed bugs in the family Rhyparochromidae. There are about 14 genera and more than 60 described species in Stygnocorini.

Genera
These 14 genera belong to the tribe Stygnocorini:

 Acompus Fieber, 1861
 Anneckocoris Slater, 1982
 Arrianus Distant, 1904
 Capenicola Slater & Sweet, 1970
 Esuridea Reuter, 1890
 Hyalochilus Fieber, 1861
 Lasiosomus Fieber, 1861
 Margareta White, 1878
 Notiocola Slater & Sweet, 1970
 Paracnemodus Slater, 1964
 Stygnocoris Douglas & Scott, 1865
 Stygnocorisella Hoberlandt, 1956
 Sweetocoris O'Rourke, 1974
 Tasmanicola Slater & Sweet, 1970

References

Further reading

External links

 

Rhyparochromidae